Gilat Satellite Networks is a public company headquartered in Israel that develops and sells VSAT satellite ground stations and related equipment. Its shares are traded on the NASDAQ Global Select Market and on the Tel Aviv Stock Exchange.

History 
Gilat Satellite Networks was founded in 1987 by brothers Joshua and Amiram Levinberg, Yoel Gat, Shlomo Tirosh, Arik Keshet, and Gideon Kaplan. In its early days, Gilat struggled to compete with larger and better-established companies the likes of EchoStar.

In 1998, Gilat was involved in founding Global Village Telecom (GVT), a company that built a satellite-based phone network for remote locations in South America using the VSAT technology that was developed by Gilat. During 1998 and 1999 GVT won tenders to build rural phone networks in Colombia, Chile and Peru

In 2000, Gilat introduced an innovation involving VSAT technology allowing remote locations, such as the Havasupai Reservation in Arizona and rural communities in Brazil, to access the internet at high speeds. In February 2000,  Gilat and Microsoft announced that they are co-developing a two-way satellite broadband service for consumer purposes. The satellite service delivered Internet connections at speeds of up to 1.5 Mbps and did not require a second telephone line. A new company, Gilat-To-Home,  was established to deliver the broadband two-way satellite service and Microsoft took an initial 26 percent stake in the company with an investment of US$50 million. In September 2000, Gilat-To-Home changed its name to StarBand Communications and received an   investment of $50 million from EchoStar, who received an equity stake of 32 percent in StarBand.

In 2011, Gilat announced the creation of a new division, headed by Brigadier General (Res.) Moshe Tamir, expanding its presence in the U.S. defense market.

Strategic acquisitions

Products 
 SkyEdge, SkyEdge II and NetEdge
 MLT-1000 ruggedized spread-spectrum satellite modem

See also 
 TA BlueTech Index
 List of Israeli companies quoted on the Nasdaq
 Board Of director: chief executive officer Meir Shamir

References 

Telecommunications companies of Israel
Telecommunications companies established in 1987
Companies listed on the Nasdaq
Companies listed on the Tel Aviv Stock Exchange
1987 establishments in Israel